Scott Douglas "Scooter" Altman (born August 15, 1959) is a retired United States Navy Captain and naval aviator, engineer, test pilot and former NASA astronaut. He is a veteran of four Space Shuttle missions. His fourth mission on STS-125 was the last servicing mission to the Hubble Space Telescope. As of November 2022, he is the president of the Space operating group for ASRC Federal.

Personal
Born in Lincoln, Illinois, Scott is married to the former Jill Shannon Loomer of Tucson, Arizona. They have three children, the second oldest of whom, Alex, graduated Rice University in Houston, Texas in May 2009. Hometown is Pekin, Illinois, where his parents, Fred and Sharon Altman, currently reside. The Pekin District 108 school board voted to honor the former astronaut by naming Scott Altman Primary School in 2010.  Scott's sister Sarah Beardsley is the publisher of Venus Zine, a women's music, DIY and culture multi-media company.  His callsigns have been "D-Bear" and Scooter.  He is a brother of the Sigma Chi fraternity.

Education
 1977: Graduated from Pekin Community High School, Pekin, Illinois
 1981: Received Bachelor of Science degree in aeronautical and astronautical engineering from the University of Illinois, where he became a member of the Sigma Chi fraternity
 1990: Received Master of Science degree in aeronautical engineering from the U.S. Naval Postgraduate School

Military career
Commissioned as an ensign in the United States Navy in August 1981, and received his Naval Aviator wings in February 1983. As a member of Fighter Squadron 51 at (then) NAS Miramar, Altman completed two deployments to the Western Pacific and Indian Ocean flying the F-14A Tomcat. In August 1987, he was selected for the Naval Postgraduate School-Test Pilot School Co-op program and graduated with Test Pilot School Class 97 in June 1990 as a Distinguished Graduate. After graduation, he spent the next two years as a test pilot working on various F-14 projects at Strike Aircraft Test Directorate NAWC AD Patuxent River Maryland. Altman then took the new F-14D on its first operational deployment with VF-31 Tomcatters, where he served as maintenance officer and later operations officer. He was awarded the Air Medal for his role as a strike leader flying over Southern Iraq in support of Operation Southern Watch. Shortly following his return from this six-month deployment, he was selected for the NASA astronaut program. He has logged over 7,000 flight hours in more than 40 types of aircraft.

He also performed many of the aerial stunts in the 1986 film Top Gun, and was the pilot that "flipped the bird" at the enemy MiG pilot (played by Robert F. Willard).

NASA career
Selected as an astronaut candidate by NASA in December 1994, Altman reported to the Lyndon B. Johnson Space Center in March 1995. He completed a year of training and was initially assigned to work technical aspects of orbiter landing and roll out issues for the Astronaut Office Vehicle Systems Branch. He was the pilot on STS-90 (1998) and STS-106 (2000), and was the mission commander on STS-109 (2002) and STS-125 (2009). A veteran of four space flights, Altman has logged over 40 days in space. Altman retired from NASA in September 2010 to join ASRC Federal Research and Technology Solutions in Greenbelt, Maryland.

Spaceflights
STS-90 Neurolab (April 17 to May 3, 1998). During the 16-day Spacelab flight the seven person crew aboard Space Shuttle Columbia served as both experiment subjects and operators for 26 individual life science experiments focusing on the effects of microgravity on the brain and nervous system.

STS-106 Atlantis (September 8–20, 2000). During the 12-day mission, the crew successfully prepared the International Space Station for the arrival of the first permanent crew. Additionally, he handflew two complete flyarounds of the station after undocking.

STS-109 Columbia (March 1–12, 2002). STS-109 was the fourth Hubble Space Telescope (HST) servicing mission. The STS-109 crew successfully upgraded the Hubble Space Telescope leaving it with a new power unit, a new camera and new solar arrays. HST servicing and upgrade was accomplished by four crewmembers during a total of 5 EVAs in 5 consecutive days. The space walkers were assisted by crewmates inside Space Shuttle Columbia. STS-109 orbited the Earth 165 times, and covered 3.9 million miles in over 262 hours, culminating in a night landing at Kennedy Space Center, Florida.

STS-125 Atlantis (May 11–24, 2009). STS-125 was the fifth and final servicing mission to the Hubble Space Telescope. Atlantis carried two new instruments to the telescope, the Cosmic Origins Spectrograph and the Wide Field Camera 3. The mission also replaced a Fine Guidance Sensor, six gyroscopes, and two battery unit modules to allow the telescope to continue to function at least through 2014. The crew also installed new thermal blanket insulating panels to provide improved thermal protection, and a soft-capture mechanism that would aid in the safe de-orbiting of the telescope by an unmanned spacecraft at the end of its operational lifespan. The mission also carried an IMAX camera and the crew documented the progress of the mission for an upcoming IMAX film.

Organizations
 University of Illinois Alumni Association
 Sigma Chi Alumni Association
 Association of Naval Aviation life member
 Military Order of the World Wars

Awards and honors
 Defense Superior Service Medal
 Legion of Merit
 Distinguished Flying Cross
 Defense Meritorious Service Medal
 Navy Strike/Flight Air Medal
 Navy Commendation Medal
 Navy Achievement Medal
 NASA Distinguished Service Medal
 1987 Award winner for Outstanding Achievement in Tactical Aviation as selected by the Association of Naval Aviation.
 United States Astronaut Hall of Fame - 2018
 Awarded the Order of Lincoln, Illinois' highest honor, on November 6, 2021, at the awards presentation.

Top Gun
In a NASA interview prior to his 2000 spaceflight, Scott Altman commented on his role as an F-14 pilot involved in the filming of Top Gun:

References

External links
 
 Spacefacts biography of Scott Altman
 

1959 births
Living people
United States Navy astronauts
People from Pekin, Illinois
Grainger College of Engineering alumni
Naval Postgraduate School alumni
United States Naval Test Pilot School alumni
United States Navy officers
United States Naval Aviators
American test pilots
Recipients of the Legion of Merit
Recipients of the Distinguished Flying Cross (United States)
Recipients of the Air Medal
Recipients of the Defense Superior Service Medal
Recipients of the NASA Distinguished Service Medal
People from Lincoln, Illinois
United States Astronaut Hall of Fame inductees
Space Shuttle program astronauts
Military personnel from Illinois